Seabird Island may refer to 

Sea Bird Island (British Columbia), until 1976 was named "Seabird Island"
Seabird Island First Nation
Seabird Indian Reserve No. 1, on Sea Bird Island and under the administration of the Seabird First Nation
Yerba Buena Island